Sir Henry Anderson (1582–1659) was an English Royalist landowner and politician who represented Newcastle-upon-Tyne once as Mayor and twice as MP in the House of Commons between 1614 and 1643 and was also High Sheriff of Northumberland.

Early life

Anderson was the son of Henry Anderson (d.1605) of Newcastle-upon-Tyne, Northumberland, and his second wife Fortune Collingwood, daughter of Sir Cuthbert Collingwood of Eslington, Northumberland. His distant cousin was the Royalist Sir Francis Anderson.

He matriculated at Christ Church, Oxford on 24 November 1599, aged 17, when he was of Long Cowton, Yorkshire. He later studied at Gray's Inn.

Career
He was of London when he was knighted at the house of Sir Thomas Hasilrig at Holmby Alderton (4 August 1608). He was Mayor of Newcastle-upon-Tyne (1613–14). In 1614, Anderson was elected Member of Parliament for Newcastle-upon-Tyne (re-elected in 1621, 1624, 1625 and 1626) and was High Sheriff of Northumberland (1615–16). Anderson sold his lands in Tyneside in the later 1620s and settled on an estate at Long Cowton, Yorkshire.

In 1637, he gained an audience with Charles I (through Henry Rich, 1st Earl of Holland and Sir Thomas Jermyn) who he tried to persuade to abandon his policy of Ship Money but the king was angered and rebuked him for his bold manner.

In November 1640, Anderson was re-elected MP for Newcastle-upon-Tyne in the Long Parliament and sat until he was removed for supporting the king on 4 September 1643. During the English Civil War, Anderson was imprisoned for distributing royalist propaganda in 1649 and his debts ensured he remained in prison for the rest of his life. He died between 7 March and 29 June 1659.

Family
Anderson married Mary Remington, daughter of Richard Remington of Lockington, Yorkshire, and they had four sons (including Richard) and one daughter. Anderson married for the second time to Frances (d. 1652), and married for the third time to Elizabeth Pinour, widow, the daughter of Constance Hopkins.

Arms

References

1582 births
1659 deaths
Anderson family of Newcastle-upon-Tyne
Cavaliers
High Sheriffs of Northumberland
English MPs 1614
English MPs 1621–1622
English MPs 1624–1625
English MPs 1625
English MPs 1626
English MPs 1640–1648
Mayors of Newcastle upon Tyne
Politicians from Newcastle upon Tyne